The 1997 Miami RedHawks football team was an American football team that represented Miami University in the Mid-American Conference (MAC) during the 1997 NCAA Division I-A football season. In its eighth season under head coach Randy Walker, Miami compiled an 8–3 record (6–2 against MAC opponents), finished in a tie for second place in the MAC, and outscored all opponents by a combined total of 412 to 226. Individual success was led by All-American punter Chad Cornelius, who selected with the 202nd pick by the Cincinnati Bengals in the 1998 NFL draft.

The team's statistical leaders included Sam Ricketts with 2,466 passing yards, Travis Prentice with 1,549 rushing yards, and Jay Hall with 861 receiving yards.

Schedule

References

Miami
Miami RedHawks football seasons
Miami Redskins football